The North Carolina Tar Heels men's tennis team, commonly referred to as Carolina, represents the University of North Carolina at Chapel Hill in NCAA Division I college tennis. North Carolina currently competes as a member of the Atlantic Coast Conference (ACC) and plays its home matches at Cone-Kenfield Tennis Center.

References

 
Men's